Suzanne Deidre Napier (née Braid; 1 January 1948 – 5 August 2010) was an Australian politician. She was a member of the Tasmanian House of Assembly for the Division of Bass. Napier was first elected in 1992 and was re-elected in 1996, 1998, 2002 and 2006.

She was born on New Years Day, 1948, in Latrobe, Tasmania, the daughter of Tasmanian Legislative Council member Harry Braid.

She was leader of the Liberal Party from 2 July 1999 until 20 August 2001. She became the  leader of the opposition when former Premier Tony Rundle resigned and she defeated leadership aspirant Bob Cheek in a party room ballot. Cheek successfully challenged Napier's leadership two years later. She was the first woman to lead the Tasmanian Liberals and the first woman to lead any major political party in Tasmania.

During her career Napier served in many portfolios including transport, youth affairs, education and opposition portfolios of business, tourism, health and infrastructure as well as Deputy Premier.

Napier was diagnosed with breast cancer in late 2008, but responded well to treatment and recovered in 2009. In February 2010, she announced that she would retire from parliament and not contest the 2010 Tasmanian election after it was discovered that the cancer had returned.

She died from breast cancer on 5 August 2010, aged 62.

References

External links
Inaugural speech to Parliament, Parliament of Tasmania

1948 births
2010 deaths
Members of the Tasmanian House of Assembly
Liberal Party of Australia members of the Parliament of Tasmania
Deputy Premiers of Tasmania
Recipients of the Centenary Medal
University of Tasmania alumni
Alumni of the University of Leeds
Deaths from breast cancer
Deaths from cancer in Tasmania
People from Latrobe, Tasmania
Leaders of the Opposition in Tasmania
21st-century Australian politicians
21st-century Australian women politicians
Women members of the Tasmanian House of Assembly